Kawashima (written: 川島, 川嶋) is a Japanese surname. Notable people with the surname include:

, musician
, Japanese volleyball player
, Japanese comedian, television personality and actor
, voice actress
, association football goalkeeper
, boxer
Justin Kawashima (born 1970), Japanese–American music producer
, boxer
Kiko, Princess Akishino, née Kawashima (川嶋紀子, born 1966)
, ski jumper
, video game composer
, spy
, actress
, voice actor
, neuroscientist 
, voice actor
, singer and actress
Yasunaru Kawashima, cardiothoracic surgeon who pioneered the Kawashima procedure
 Manchu princess and spy
, Japanese ice hockey player
, filmmaker

Fictional characters
, a main character from Toradora!
, a main character from Hibike! Euphonium
, side character from Food Wars!

See also
Kawashima, Gifu
Kawashima, Tokushima

Japanese-language surnames